Wang Zhao (王照, 1859–1933), courtesy name Xiaohang, nicknamed Luzhong Qiongshi , alias Shuidong, was a native of Ninghe County, Zhili (modern-day Tianjin), northern China. He was a Chinese linguist, an advocate of modern phonetic writing. He created a sort of kana-like syllabary for Chinese writing in imitation of the native Japanese syllabic writing system. It was called Mandarin Letters (Guanhua zimu) or the “Mandarin Chinese Harmonic Alphabet”, and was a stroke-style writing system, similar to pinyin, based on the Mandarin dialect. While the writing system is no longer used, he, more than any other individual, was responsible for making Mandarin China's national language.

Life 
Wang Zhao lost his father when he was young and was raised by his uncle. In the 20th year of Emperor Guangxu of the Qing Dynasty (1894), he was awarded the Jinshi Enke in the Jiawu period. In April of the twenty-first year of Guangxu, the museum was dismantled, and he was appointed as the chief of the Ministry of Rites. In the twenty-fourth year of Guangxu (1898), he and Xu Shichang co-organized the No. 1 Primary School in Fengzhi of Eight Banners. During the 1880 Reform, he wanted to submit a letter to advise the Guangxu Emperor to honor the Empress Dowager Cixi "to travel to China and foreign countries". After the Emperor Guangxu read the book, he ordered the six officials of the Ministry of Rites to be dismissed, who had obstructed the letter. After the failure of the Hundred Days Reform, he fled to Japan.

During the Boxer Rebellion in 1900, he secretly returned to China, created the "Mandarin Alphabet" in Tianjin, and wrote the "Mandarin Harmonic Alphabet", which became China's first set of stroke-style pinyin writing schemes for Chinese characters.

In 1901, the Qing court ordered to open the original title, but he did not become an official. After Emperor Xuantong ascended the throne, the Pinyin Mandarin Newspaper violated the taboo of the Regent Prince Zaifeng. During the Revolution of 1911, Jiang Yanxing, the governor of the Jiangbei governor 's office, sent Wang Zhao as a representative to Shanghai to attend the meeting of the provincial governor's office representative federation. After the Revolution of 1911, he lived in Nanjing.

In 1913, he served as vice-chairman of the Union of Pronunciation Union, and later resigned. As S. Robert Ramsey tells it in his account of the proceedings:

Few of the delegates at the 1913 conference on pronunciation seem to have had any idea of what they were up against. The negotiations were marked by frustratingly naïve arguments. “Germany is strong,” it was said, “because its language contains many voiced sounds and China is weak because Mandarin lacks them.” But if linguistic knowledge was in short supply, commitment to position was not. Passions were hot, and frustrations grew. Finally, after months of no progress, Wang Zhao, the leader of the Mandarin faction, called for a new system of voting in which each province would have one and only one vote, knowing full well that the numerically superior Mandarin-speaking area would then automatically dominate. Delegates in other areas were incensed. The situation became explosive. Then, as tempers flared, Wang Rongbao, one of the leaders of the Southern faction, happened to use the colloquial Shanghai expression for ‘ricksha,’ wangbo ts’o. Wang Zhao misheard it for the Mandarin curse wángba dàn ‘son of a bitch [literally turtle’s egg],’ and flew into a rage. He bared his arms and attacked Wang Rongbao, chasing him out of the assembly hall. Wang Rangbao never returned to the meetings. Wang Zhao’s suggestion to change the voting procedure was adopted, and after three months of bitter struggling, the Mandarin faction had its way. The conference adopted a resolution recommending that the sounds of Mandarin become the national standard.

In his later years, he studied classics and advocated education to save the country. In 1933, Wang Zhao died.

Family 
The great-grandfather, Wang Xipeng, was the chief soldier and died in the Opium War.

He has a brother Wang Xie and a younger brother Wang Zhuo.

Books 
 Preface to Liang Shuming's Preface to Mr. Wang Xiaohang's Wencun
 "Mandarin Alphabet School Series"
 "Pinyin to Wenbaijia Surname"
 "Pinyin Dialogue Three Character Classic"
 "Pinyin Conversation with Thousand Characters"
 "Mandarin Alphabet Vocabulary"
 "Mandarin Alphabet Readings"
 "Water East Collection"
 "Book of Mandarin Pinyin for Beginners"
 "Mandarin Harmonic Alphabet"

Bibliography
Tsu, Jing. Kingdom of Characters: The Language Revolution That Made China Modern. Riverhead Books, 2022.

See also 

 Chinese Pinyin
 Movements to abolish Chinese characters

References

Linguists from China
1859 births
1933 deaths
People from Tianjin
19th-century Chinese educators
20th-century Chinese educators
Qing dynasty politicians
People of the 1911 Revolution